WMEG (106.9 FM), branded on-air as La Mega, is a radio station broadcasting a Top 40/CHR format. Licensed to Guayama, Puerto Rico, it serves the greater San Juan area.  The station is currently owned by WMEG Licensing, Inc., a division of the Spanish Broadcasting System. Until 2004, La Mega 106.9 FM had an American Alternative Top 40 format. Music was 100% in English from Pop, Rock, Hip-Hop to Techno. In 2004 the station began to air Reggaeton music along with the original format. In the latter part of 2006 and early 2007, the station began to air Latin Top 40 Rock along with Reggaeton music and airing more pop and hip-hop than rock. As of 2008 the station distances completely from the original format airing about 80% of Latin Top 40 music, 10% of American Top 40 and 10% of reggaeton.

External links

MEG
Radio stations established in 1966
Contemporary hit radio stations in the United States
Spanish Broadcasting System radio stations
Guayama, Puerto Rico
1966 establishments in Puerto Rico